The Lesotho Catholic Bishops' Conference is a member of the Inter-Regional Meeting of Bishops of Southern Africa (IMBISA) and Symposium of Episcopal Conferences of Africa and Madagascar (SECAM).

The local bishops are members of the Conference of Catholic Bishops of Lesotho (Lesotho Catholic Bishops' Conference).

Presidents of the Bishops' Conference

1972-1982: Alfonso Liguori Morapeli, Archbishop of Maseru

1982-1987: Sebastian Koto Khoarai, Bishop of Mohale's Hoek

1987-1991: Paul Khoarai, Bishop of Leribe

1991-1997: Evaristus Thatho Bitsoane, bishop of Qacha's Nek

1997-2002: Bernard Mohlalisi, Archbishop of Maseru

2002-2010: Evaristus Thatho Bitsoane, bishop of Qacha's Nek

2011 - ... : Gerard Tlali Lerotholi, Archbishop of Maseru

References

External links
 http://www.gcatholic.org/dioceses/country/LS.htm
 http://www.catholic-hierarchy.org/country/ls.html 

Lesotho
Catholic Church in Lesotho

it:Chiesa cattolica nel Lesotho#Conferenza episcopale